Itagonia cordiformis is a species of beetle, endemic to Tibet, China. It was first described in 2007.

References

Tenebrionidae
Beetles of Asia
Endemic fauna of Tibet
Beetles described in 2007